Imam Hasan, also spelled Emam Hasan, may refer to:

People 

 Hasan ibn Ali (–670), sometimes also referred to as : son of Ali ibn Abi Talib, grandson of the prophet Muhammad, and second Shia Imam
 Hasan al-Askari (–874), the eleventh Shia Imam
 Hasan al-Basri (–728), early and influential Islamic scholar from Basra (Iraq), venerated in Sunni Islam and sometimes called the 'Imam of Basra'

Places 

 Imam Hassan, Iran, a city in Bushehr province, Iran
 Imam Hassan District, a district in Deylam county, Bushehr province, Iran
 A number of villages in Kermanshah Province, Iran:
 Emam Hasan-e Olya
 Emam Hasan-e Sofla
 Emam Hasan-e Vasati